Elias is the Greek equivalent of Elijah ( ʾĒlīyyāhū; Syriac: ܐܠܝܐ Eliyā; Arabic: الیاس Ilyās/Elyās), a prophet in the Northern Kingdom of Israel in the 9th century BC, mentioned in several holy books. Due to Elias' role in the scriptures and to many later associated traditions, the name is used as a personal name in numerous languages.

Variants
 Éilias Irish
 Elia Italian, English
 Elias Norwegian
 Elías Icelandic
 Éliás Hungarian
 Elías Spanish
 Eliáš, Elijáš Czech
 Elias, Eelis, Eljas Finnish
 Elias Danish, German, Swedish
 Elias Portuguese
 Elias, Iliya Persian
 Elias, Elis Swedish
 Elias, Elyas  Ethiopian
 Elias, Elyas Philippines
 Eliasz Polish
 Élie French
 Elija Slovene
 Elijah English, Hebrew
 Elis Welsh
 Elisedd Welsh
 Eliya (එලියා) Sinhala
 Eliyas (Ілияс) Kazakh
 Eliyahu, Eliya (אֵלִיָּהוּ, אליה)  Biblical Hebrew, Hebrew
 Elyās, Ilyās, Eliya Arabic
 Elliot, Elliott English
 Ellis English, Welsh (anglicised)
 Helias Ecclesiastical Latin
 Ilia (Илия) Bulgarian, Church Slavonic, Macedonian, Russian
 Ilia (ილია) Georgian
 Ilias (Ηλίας) Koine Greek
 Ilias (Ηλίας) Modern Greek
 Ilie Romanian
 Ilija (Илија) Croatian, Macedonian, Serbian
 Ilja German
 Iljo (Иљо) Macedonian
 Iliya (Илия) Bulgarian
 Illés Hungarian
 Illia (Ілля) Ukrainian
 Ilya (Илья) Russian
 İlyas Turkish
Ilyos Uzbek
 Ilias/Ilyas/Elias/Elyas/Alias/Alyas Malay
 Líggjas Faroese
 Yeghia (Եղիա) Armenian
 埃利亚斯 (āi lì yǎ sī) Chinese

Feminized variants
 Iliana (Илиана) Bulgarian
 Ilina (Илина) Bulgarian, Macedonian
 Ilinca Romanian
 Ilinka (Илинка) Croatian, Macedonian, Serbian
 Eliana, Iliana Greek
 Éliane French

People with the given name
 Elias, a Greek scholar and commentator on Aristotle and Porphyry
 Elias of Armenia, Armenian religious leader, Catholicos of All Armenians from 703 to 717
 Elias of Nisibis (975–1046), Nestorian bishop of Nisibis and an important mediaeval chronicler, also known as Elijah of Nisibis and Eliya bar Shinaya
 Elias, Duke of Parma (1880–1959), head of the House of Bourbon-Parma and pretender to the defunct throne of Parma 
 Elías Ahúja y Andría (1863–1951), Spanish politician
 Elias Alves da Silva (born 1981), Brazilian football player
 Elias Ammerbach (1530–1597), German organist
 Elias Ashmole (1617–1692), English antiquary and politician
 Elias Atallah (born 1947), Lebanese politician
 Elias Atmatsidis (born 1969), Greek football player
 Elias Bender Rønnenfelt (born 1992), Danish singer
 Elias ibn Mudar, c. 10 AD - Arab chieftain
 Elias Boudinot (1740–1821), American politician
 Elias Boudinot (Cherokee) (1802–1839), Native American writer
 Elias Breeskin (1896–1969), Russian violinist
 Elias Canetti (1905–1994), Bulgarian writer
 Elias Chandler (1856–1909), American colonel and major 
 Elias Charalambous (born 1980), Cypriot footballer
 Elias James Corey (born 1928), American chemist
 Elias Dayton (1737–1807), American soldier and politician
 Elias P. Demetracopoulos, Greek journalist
 Elias Disney (1859–1941), Canadian businessman, father of Walt Disney
 Elias Dolah (born 1993), Thai footballer
 Elias (footballer, born 1963), Portuguese footballer, full name Fernando Elias Oliveira da Silva
 Elias Farkouh (1948–2020), Jordanian writer
 Elias Freij (1918–1998), Palestinian mayor
 Elias Gleizer (1934–2015), Brazilian actor and comedian
 Elias Gottlob Haussmann (1695–1774), German painter
 Elias Harris (born 1989), German basketball player
 Elias Holl (1573–1646), German architect
 Elias Howe (1819–1867), American inventor of the sewing machine
 Elias Hrawi (1925–2006), Lebanese politician
 Elias Kane (1794–1835), American politician
 Elias Khoury (born 1948), Lebanese writer
 Elias Koteas (born 1961), Greek-Canadian actor
 Elias Lianos, Greek businessman
 Elias Lindholm (born 1994), Swedish ice hockey player
 Elias Lönnrot (1802–1884), Finnish philologist
 Elias Loomis (1811–1889), American mathematician
 Elias Mendes Trindade (1985), Brazilian football player
 Elias Motsoaledi (1924-1994), South African anti-apartheid activist
 Elias Murr (born 1962), Lebanese politician
 Elias Pavlidis (born 1978), Greek boxer
 Elias Petropoulos (1928–2003), Greek musicologist and writer
 Elias Pettersson (born 1998), Swedish ice hockey player
 Elias Polk (1806-1886), American slave and political activist
 Elias Porter (1914–1987), American psychologist
 Elias Rababi (1913–1999), Lebanese journalist and politician
 Elias Alford Rowan (1837-1912), American politician
 Elias Ricks, American football player
 Elias Samson (or simply Elias), ring name of Jeffrey Logan Sciullo, American professional wrestler
 Elias Sarkis (1924–1985), Lebanese politician
 Elias (singer), French singer-songwriter
 Elias "Vic" Seixas (born 1923), American Hall of Fame former top-10 tennis player
 Elias Spantidakis (1886-1914), Greek-American union leader
 Elias M. Stein (1931–2018), American mathematician
 Elias Tahan (born 1986), American photographer
 Elias Toufexis (born 1975), Greek-Canadian actor
 Elias Vattis (born 1986), Cypriot football player
 Elias Venezis (1904–1973), Greek writer
 Elias Viljanen (born 1975), Finnish musician
 Elias Wessén (1889–1981), Swedish linguist
 Elias Wright (1830–1901), American Union brevet brigadier general during the Civil War era 
 Elias Zerhouni (born 1951), Algerian-born American doctor
 Elias Zoghby (1912–2008), Lebanese archbishop

Fictional characters with the given name
 Elias Acorn, Prince and later King of the Kingdom of Acorn in Sonic the Hedgehog by Archie; he is the older brother of Sally Acorn.
 Elias, a prominent gangster whose goals lead him to both conflict and work with (directly and indirectly) in the TV series Person of Interest; he is shot in the head and perhaps killed in the 4th season's finale during a fight with a rival gang leader  
 Elias Bogan, fictional character in the Marvel Comics universe
 Elias Grover, fictional character in the 2006 film Clerks II
 Sergeant Elias Grodin, fictional character portrayed by Willem Dafoe in the 1986 film Platoon
 Elias, fictional character in Panel de Pon
 Elias Ryker, fictional character in Richard K. Morgan's novel, Altered Carbon
 Elias Taylor, fictional character in V (1983 miniseries)
 Elias "Eli" Thompson, fictional character in the television series Boardwalk Empire
 Elijah "Eli" Goldsworthy, fictional character from Degrassi: The Next Generation
 Elías, a main character from José Rizal's patriotic novel "Noli Me Tángere"
 Elias Carstairs, a character from Cassandra Clare's "The Infernal Devices" prequel to "The Mortal Instruments"
 Elias Walker, fictional character in the 2013 video game Call of Duty: Ghosts
 Dr. Elias Huer, fictional character from "Buck Rogers in the 25th Century" (1979)
 Elias "Blitz" Kötz, fictional character in the 2015 video game  Tom Clancy's Rainbow Six Siege
 Elias Venturius, one of the two protagonists of the Sabaa Tahir novel An Ember in the Ashes
 Elias Rahim, fiction character in the television series The OA
 Elias Bouchard, the Head of the Magnus Institute in horror fiction podcast The Magnus Archives
Elias, fictional character from the 2015 comedy film Men & Chicken
Elias Ainsworth fictional character from The Ancient Magus' Bride

People with the surname
 Akhteruzzaman Elias (1943—1997), Bengali writer
 Alois Eliáš (1890–1942), Czechoslovak general and politician
 Benny Elias (born 1963), Lebanese-Australian rugby league player
 Blas Elias (born 1967), American musician
 Dave Elias (1969-2013), Canadian curler
 David Elias (born 1949), Canadian writer
 Eliane Elias (born 1960), Lebanese-Brazilian musician
 Erick Elías (born 1980), Mexican actor
 Eulalia Elias (1788–1865), American rancher
 Gastão Elias (born 1990), Portuguese tennis player
 Hanin Elias (born 1972), German musician
 Hendrik Elias (1902–1973), Belgian politician
 Isaak Elias (1912-1998), Canadian politician
 Joan Puig i Elias (1898–1972), Catalan pedagogue and anarchist
 Johan Engelbert Elias (1895–1959), Dutch historian, also known as Vroedschap van Amsterdam
 John Elias (born 1963), Lebanese-Australian rugby league footballer and coach
 Jonathan Elias (born 1956), American composer
 Lee Elias (1920–1998), American comics artist
 Manny Elias (born 1953), English drummer
 Mike Elias (born 1982), American baseball executive
 Norbert Elias (1897–1990), German sociologist
 Patrik Eliáš (born 1976), Czech ice hockey player
 Peter Elias (1923–2001), American computer scientist
 Rick Elias, Nashville songwriter and singer
 Robert Elias, birth name of Robert Downey Sr., American actor and film director
 Roenis Elías, Cuban Major League Baseball pitcher
 Rosalind Elias (1930-2020), American singer
 Quentin Elias (1980-2014), French model and actor
 Sandy Abi Elias, Lebanese footballer
 Sian Elias (born 1949), New Zealand judge
 Taslim Olawale Elias (1914–1991), Nigerian judge
 Ton Elias (born 1955), retired Dutch politician
 Toni Elías (born 1983), Spanish motorcyclist
 Zé Elias (born 1976), Brazilian football player

See also
 Elia (disambiguation)
 Elijah (disambiguation)
 Elphas
 Ilias (name)
 Saint Elias (disambiguation)

References

Russian Mennonite surnames
Danish masculine given names
English masculine given names
Finnish masculine given names
German masculine given names
Greek masculine given names
Norwegian masculine given names
Scandinavian masculine given names
Spanish masculine given names
Swedish masculine given names
Swiss masculine given names